The Hungary men's national basketball team represents Hungary in international basketball tournaments. It is governed by the Hungarian Basketball Federation (MKOSZ).

Hungary's best period during international competition came in the 1940s to the 1960s. It was where the national team won several medals at the EuroBasket (1946, 1953, 1955), and reached the Olympic Games on four out of the first six occasions of the event overall. However, after that era, the team has only qualified for the continental showpiece three times (1999, 2017, 2022) since 1969. Hungary also continues to vie for their debut appearance to the FIBA World Cup.

History

EuroBasket 1935
The Hungarian side came in ninth place at the first European Basketball Championship, the EuroBasket 1935 held by the International Basketball Federation's FIBA Europe continental federation. They faced the eventual champions Latvia in the preliminary round, falling 46–12. In the classification matches, the Hungarians lost to Bulgaria, then defeated Romania to finish ninth with a 1–2 record.

EuroBasket 1939
After not competing in the 1937 edition, the Hungarians returned to the EuroBasket 1939. Once again, Hungary was one of eight teams that qualified for the event. Hungary lost its first six games. The biggest defeat was a massive blowout to the host Lithuania 79-15. Although in their last match, Hungary displayed a strong performance as they defeated Finland 45-16 which provided some reconciliation for their loss against Lithuania. Hungary eventually finished the tournament seventh in the eight team field.

EuroBasket 1946
The next European competition was the EuroBasket 1946. Hungary placed second in their preliminary round group of four, losing to Italy but defeating Luxembourg and Poland. This qualified the Hungarians for the semi-finals, which they lost to Czechoslovakia. In the bronze medal match, Hungary defeated France 38–32.

EuroBasket 1947
Hungary competed at the EuroBasket 1947 the next year. Their 1–1 record in the preliminary phase was sufficient for them to advance to the semifinal groups; However, they lost all three games there. In the 7th/8th place classification match, they defeated Bulgaria 59–29 to finish seventh of the fourteen teams.

EuroBasket 1953
Hungary's next appearance at the EuroBasket 1953 in Moscow, resulted in the team's second EuroBasket medal. Their preliminary group adversaries included hosts and defending champions Soviet Union, who gave Hungary their only loss in the pool. Their 2–1 record put Hungary in second place in the pool and advanced them to the final round.  There, they lost again to the Soviets as well as fellow perennial powers Czechoslovakia and France. Hungary defeated the other four teams in the round, however, their 4–3 record put them in a tie with Czechoslovakia, France, and Israel. The Hungarians came out on top of the tie-breaker, as they finished in second place overall behind the Soviet Union to take the silver medal.

EuroBasket 1955
The Hungarian capital Budapest gained the hosting rights for the EuroBasket 1955. The results of the preliminary round were hardly surprising for the Hungarians, as they won all three of their games to proceed to the final round. Their first match in that round was against Czechoslovakia, and the Hungarians quickly found themselves in the bottom half of the final round group with a 75–65 loss. Their next four games, however, were much different and Hungary defeated Poland, Italy, Bulgaria and Yugoslavia to rise to a 4–1 record. This put them in a tie for the lead of the group with the Soviet Union, which had lost to Czechoslovakia.

In a game that was never particularly close, the Hungarians handed the Soviets only their second loss, 82–68, in 34 games and four EuroBasket tournaments. Hungary advanced to 5–1, in sole lead of the pool, which they never relinquished. Hungary then finished it all off in victorious fashion over Romania to win the gold medal at the Euros for the first time.

EuroBasket 1957
At the EuroBasket 1957 Hungary cruised to a 3-0 record in their preliminary phase group, with their only true test coming in a narrow 66-65 victory over Romania. It was enough for national team to advance to the final round of the competition. There, they lost in turn to each of the other three preliminary pool winners, finishing at 4–3 in the round to take fourth place overall.

EuroBasket 2017
EuroBasket 2017 marked the first EuroBasket appearance for the national team since 1999. With no real expectations heading into it, Hungary surprised many with their performance in the preliminary stage getting their first EuroBasket victory since 1969. They finished with a 2-3 record, with wins over the Czech Republic, and Romania. It was enough for the national team to advance to the knockout stage. There they matched up against Serbia, where they put up an valiant effort in defeat against the eventual runners-up 86-78.

EuroBasket 2022 qualification
At the EuroBasket 2022 qualification, Hungary surprisingly defeated defending Champion Slovenia 77-75. Benedek Váradi labelled the victory as "among the most important" in his career.

Competitive record

FIBA World Cup

Olympic Games

Notes
 Hungary withdrew from the tournament.FIBA considers two games as forfeited (walkover)

EuroBasket

Recent results and forthcoming fixtures

2021

2022

2023

Team

Current roster
Roster for the 2023 FIBA World Cup Qualifiers matches on 23 and 26 February 2023 against Lithuania and Bosnia and Herzegovina.

Depth chart

Head coach history

Past rosters
1935 EuroBasket: finished 9th among 10 teams

3 Zoltán Csányi, 4 Ferenc Kolozs, 5 Emil Kozma, 6 Tibor Lehel, 7 Sándor Lelkes, 8 Sándor Nagy, 9 László Rózsa, 10 István Szamosi, 11 Zoltán Szúnyogh, 12 Ferenc Velkei (Coach: István Király)

1939 EuroBasket: finished 7th among 8 teams

3 Aba Szathmary, 4 János Gyimesi, 5 Géza Bajári, 6 Ferenc Velkei, 7 Géza Kardos, 8 Gyula Stolpa, 10 Sándor Csányi, 11 Zoltán Csányi, 12 János Szabó, 13 István Szamosi (Coach: István Király)

1946 EuroBasket: finished 3rd  among 10 teams

3 Tibor Mezőfi, 4 Antal Bánkuti, 5 Géza Bajári, 6 Ferenc Velkei, 7 Géza Kardos, 8 Ede Vadászi, 9 György Nagy, 11 Laszlo Kiralyhidi, 12 Géza Rácz, 14 Ferenc Németh (MVP) (Coach: István Király)

1947 EuroBasket: finished 7th among 14 teams

3 Laszlo Kiralyhidi, 4 László Novakovszky, 5 Ervin Kassai, 6 Gyula Toth, 8 Ede Vadászi, 9 Tibor Mezőfi, 10 Ferenc Németh, 11 Antal Bánkuti, 12 István Timár-Geng, 13 Béla Bánkuti, 14 Géza Kardos, 15 László Nádasdy (Coach: István Király)

1948 Olympic Games: finished 16th among 23 teams

3 György Nagy, 4 László Novakovszky, 5 Tibor Mezőfi, 6 István Lovrics, 7 Géza Kardos, 8 Ede Vadászi, 9 Tibor Zsíros, 10 János Halász, 11 Antal Bánkuti, 12 Attila Timár-Geng, 13 István Timár-Geng, 14 József Kozma (Coach: István Király)

1952 Olympic Games: finished 16th among 23 teams

3 György Telegdy, 4 György Bokor, 5 Tibor Mezőfi, 6 László Bánhegyi, 7 Péter Papp, 8 János Greminger, 9 Tibor Zsíros, 10 Pál Bogár, 11 János Simon, 13 Tibor Cselkó, 14 László Hódi, 15 Tibor Czinkán, 16 Ede Komáromi (Coach: János Páder)

1953 EuroBasket: finished 2nd  among 17 teams

3 László Bánhegyi, 4 György Bokor, 5 Tibor Mezőfi, 6 Tibor Czinkán, 7 Péter Papp, 8 János Greminger, 9 Tibor Zsíros, 10 Pál Bogár, 11 János Simon, 12 Ede Komáromi, 13 Tibor Cselkó, 14 Tibor Remai, 15 László Hódi (Coach: János Páder)

1955 EuroBasket: finished 1st  among 18 teams

3 László Bánhegyi, 4 Tibor Czinkán, 5 Tibor Mezőfi, 6 László Hódi, 7 Péter Papp, 8 János Greminger (MVP), 9 Tibor Zsíros, 10 Pál Bogár, 11 János Simon, 12 János Bencze, 13 Tibor Cselkó, 14 Laszlo Toth, 15 János Dallos (Coach: János Páder)

1957 EuroBasket: finished 4th among 16 teams

3 László Bánhegyi, 4 Tibor Czinkán, 5 László Gabányi, 6 Zoltán Judik, 7 István Liptay, 8 János Greminger, 9 Tibor Zsíros, 10 Laszlo Toth, 11 János Simon, 12 János Bencze, 13 Pál Borbély, 14 Ervin Keszey (Coach: Zoltán Csányi)

1959 EuroBasket: finished 4th among 17 teams

3 László Bánhegyi, 4 Tibor Czinkán, 5 László Gabányi, 6 Zoltán Judik, 7 Ottó Temesvári, 8 János Greminger, 9 Tibor Zsíros, 10 Miklós Boháty, 11 János Simon, 12 János Bencze, 13 Kotszan Merenyi, 14 Árpád Glatz (Coach: János Páder)

1960 Olympic Games: finished 9th among 16 teams

3 László Bánhegyi, 4 Ottó Temesvári, 5 László Gabányi, 6 Zoltán Judik, 7 István Liptay, 8 János Greminger, 9 Tibor Zsíros, 10 Miklós Boháty, 11 János Simon, 12 János Bencze, 14 György Pólik, 15 Árpád Glatz (Coach: János Páder)

1961 EuroBasket: finished 6th among 19 teams

4 Miklós Boháty, 5 László Gabányi, 6 István Sahin Tóth, 7 Istvan Liptai, 8 János Tuboly, 9 György Pólik, 10 Geza Gyulai, 11 Gabor Kulcsar, 12 János Bencze, 13 Ottó Temesvári, 14 Valer Banna, 15 József Kovács (Coach: János Páder)

1963 EuroBasket: finished 4th among 16 teams

4 Miklós Boháty, 5 László Gabányi, 6 György Pólik, 7 György Vajdovics, 8 János Greminger, 9 József Prieszol, 10 Árpád Glatz, 11 János Simon, 12 János Bencze, 13 Tibor Kangyal, 14 Ottó Temesvári, 15 Pál Koczka (Coach: Tibor Zsíros)

1964 Olympic Games: finished 13th among 16 teams

4 Miklós Boháty, 5 László Gabányi, 6 György Pólik, 7 Pál Koczka, 8 János Greminger, 9 József Prieszol, 10 Tibor Kangyal, 11 Ödön Lendvay, 12 János Bencze, 13 János Rácz, 14 András Haán, 15 Árpád Glatz (Coach: Tibor Zsíros)

1965 EuroBasket: finished 15th among 16 teams

4 Matyas Ranky, 5 Laszlo Orbay, 6 György Pólik, 7 Pál Koczka, 8 Gábor Kulcsár, 9 István Fekete, 10 Valer Banna, 11 Ödön Lendvay, 12 Ferenc Haris, 13 János Rácz, 14 József Tóth, 15 Laszlo Koranyi (Coach: Tibor Zsíros)

1967 EuroBasket: finished 13th among 16 teams

4 Laszlo Orbay, 5 László Gabányi, 6 György Pólik, 7 József Kovács, 8 Gábor Kulcsár, 9 József Prieszol, 10 Valer Banna, 11 Imre Nyitrai, 12 Laszlo Koranyi, 13 István Halmos, 14 Ödön Lendvay, 15 Tibor Kangyal (Coach: János Szabó)

1969 EuroBasket: finished 8th among 12 teams

4 Laszlo Orbay, 5 László Gabányi, 6 József Kovács, 7 Tamás Pálffy, 8 István Bánhegyi, 9 József Prieszol, 10 Valer Banna, 11 Ödön Lendvay, 12 István Gyurasits, 13 Sándor Gellér, 14 Szabolcs Hody, 15 István Hegedűs (Coach: Rezso Eszeki)

1999 EuroBasket: finished 14th among 16 teams

4 Ernő Sitku, 5 Tamás Bencze, 6 László Kálmán, 7 Rolland Halm, 8 István Németh, 9 Kornél Dávid, 10 Tibor Pankár, 11 Zoltán Boros, 12 László Orosz, 13 Róbert Gulyás, 14 Zalán Mészáros, 15 László Czigler (Coach: Lajos Mészáros)

2017 EuroBasket: finished 16th among 24 teams

4 András Ruják, 5 Rosco Allen, 6 Ákos Keller, 7 Krisztián Wittmann, 8 Ádám Hanga, 9 Dávid Vojvoda, 10 Péter Kovács, 11 Norbert Tóth, 12 Csaba Ferencz, 20 Zoltán Perl, 21 Kemal Karahodžić, 22 János Eilingsfeld (Coach: Stojan Ivković)

2022 EuroBasket: finished 23rd among 24 teams

1 Mikael Hopkins, 5 Rosco Allen, 6 Ákos Keller (C), 8 Ádám Hanga, 9 Dávid Vojvoda, 11 Szilárd Benke, 12 Ádám Somogyi,14 György Golomán, 15 Csaba Ferencz, 20 Zoltán Perl, 22 János Eilingsfeld, 25 Benedek Váradi (Coach: Stojan Ivković)

Kit

Manufacturer
2016–2019: Spalding

Sponsor
2019: K&H Bank

See also

Hungary women's national basketball team
Hungary men's national under-20 basketball team
Hungary men's national under-18 basketball team
Hungary men's national under-16 basketball team
Hungary men's national 3x3 team
Sport in Hungary

References

External links

 
Hungary FIBA profile
Hungarian National Team – Men at Eurobasket.com
Hungary Basketball Records at FIBA Archive

Videos
Hungary v Great Britain - Highlights - FIBA EuroBasket 2017 Qualifiers Youtube.com video

 
Men's national basketball teams
 
FIBA EuroBasket-winning countries